Tmazight or Tarifit Berber, also known as Riffian is a Zenati Berber language spoken in the Rif region in northern Morocco. It is spoken natively by some 1,271,000 Rifians primarily in the Rif provinces of Al Hoceima, Nador and Driouch. Tarifit is strongly influenced by the Arabic language, and borrowed foreign loanwords represent 51.7% of the total Tarifit vocabulary (56.1% of nouns and 44.1% of verbs).

Name 
In the Rif, the native name of this language is 'Tmaziɣt' (pronounced Tmazixt in most dialects). Speakers may specify by calling it 'Tarifiyt' (pronounced Tarifect in central dialects).

Classification

Riffian is a Zenati Berber language which consists of various sub-dialects specific to each clan and of which a majority are spoken in the Rif region, a large mountainous area of Northern Morocco, and a minority spoken in the western part of neighbouring Algeria.

Geographic distribution

Riffian is spoken mainly in the Moroccan Rif on the Mediterranean coast and in the Rif mountains, with a large minority in the Spanish autonomous city of Melilla. There are also speakers of Riffian in Morocco outside the Rif region, notably in the rest of Moroccan cities where they compose a minority. The neighbour state of Algeria is also home to Rif minorities. A Riffian-speaking community exists in the Netherlands and Belgium as well as to a lesser extent other European countries.

Morocco 
There is a large amount of dialectal variation in Riffian Berber; this can easily be seen using the dialect Atlas (Lafkioui, 1997), however Riffian compose a single language with its own phonetical innovations distinct from other Berber languages. Majority of them are spoken in Northern Morocco, this includes the varieties of Al Hoceima, Temsamane, Nador, Ikbadene (including Iznasen) and the more southernly variety in the Taza province. Besides Riffian, two other related and smaller Berber languages are spoken in North Morocco: the Sanhaja de Srair and the Ghomara languages. They are only distantly related to Riffian and are not mutually intelligible with it.

Algeria 

A few Riffian dialects are or used to be in the western part of Algeria, notably by the Beni Snouss tribe of the Tlemcen, as well in Bethioua but also in various colonial districts Riffians started to emigrate to since the 19th century.

Dialects

There is no consensus on what varieties are considered Riffian and not, the difference of opinion mainly lie in the easternmost dialects of the Iznasen and the westernmost dialects of Senhaja de Sraïr and Ketama. Dialects include West-Riffian (Al Hoceima), Central-Riffian (Nador) and East-Riffian (Berkan). Iznasen (Iznacen, Beni Snassen) is counted as a dialect in Kossman (1999), but Blench (2006) classifies it as one of the closely related Mzab–Wargla languages.

Phonology

Vowels 

 A mid-central vowel /ə/ can occur in lax positions.
 Lax allophones of /i, a, u/ are heard as [ɪ, æ, ʊ].
 In the vicinity of pharyngealized consonants, /i, a, u/ are heard as [ɪˤ, ɑˤ, ʊˤ].
 When r becomes vocalized, the following diphthongs are heard [ɛa, a ~ æ, ɔa]
 When ṛ becomes vocalized, the following diphthongs are heard [ɪˤɑ, ɑˤ, ʊˤa]

Consonants 
In the history of Western and Central Riffian /l/ has become /r/ in a lot of words. In most dialects there is no difference in this consonant (ř) and in original r, but in some dialects it is more clearly distinguished by the fact that ř is trilled while r is a tap.

All consonants except for /ŋ/, /tʃ/ and /ʔ/ have a geminate counterpart. Most of the time, a geminate is only different from its plain counterpart because of its length; this is the case for /bː/, /dː/, /fː/, /gː/, /ɦː/, /ħː/, /jː/, /kː/, /lː/, /mː/, /nː/, /pː/, /pˤː/, /qː/, /r/, /rˤ/, /sː/, /sˤː/, /ʃː/, /ʃˤː/, /tː/, /tˤː/, /χː/, /zː/, /zˤː/, /ʒː/ and /ʕː/. Spirantized consonants have long stops as their geminate counterparts, e.g. yezḏeɣ  'he lives' vs. izeddeɣ  'he always lives'. A few consonants have divergent geminated counterparts; ḍ (/dˤ/ and /ðˤ/) to ṭṭ (/tˤː/), w (/w/) to kkʷ (/kːʷ/), ɣ (/ʁ/) to qq (/qː/), and ř (/r/) to ǧ (/dʒː/). There are some exceptions to this. This is most common with ww, e.g. acewwaf  'hair', and rarely occurs with ɣɣ and ḍḍ e.g. iɣɣed  'ashes', weḍḍaạ  'to be lost'. /dʒ/ and /dʒː/ are allophonic realizations of the same phoneme, both are common.

Notes:
 /ʝ/ has become /j/ in most of Central Riffian e.g. ayenduz  instead of aɡ̠enduz  'calf'.
 /ç/ has mostly become /ʃ/ in Central Riffian and only occurs in a few words, e.g. seḵsu  'couscous'.
 Pharyngealization is a spreading feature, it may spread to a whole word.
 The only pharyngealized consonants common in Berber roots are /dˤ/, /ðˤ/, /zˤ/ and /rˤ/; the others seem to mainly occur in words of Arabic and Spanish origin.
 /ʃˤ/ seems to only occur in the nouns ucca  'greyhound' and mucc .
 /ŋ/ occurs exclusively before the consonant /w/, it may be an assimalatory variant of n.
 Labialization only occurs with the geminates /kːʷ/ and /gːʷ/.

Assimilations 
There are quite a few assimilations that occur with the feminine suffixes t and ṯ.

ḇ + ṯ = fṯ/ft (e.g. tajeǧeft < tajeǧeḇṯ 'gown/djellaba')
z + ṯ = sṯ/st (e.g. talwist < talwizṯ 'gold coin')
ẓ + ṯ = ṣṯ/ṣt (e.g. tayạạẓiṣt < tayạạẓiẓṯ 'hare')
j + ṯ = cṯ/ct (e.g. taɛejjact < taɛejjajṯ 'dust')
ɣ + ṯ = xṯ/xt (e.g. tmazixt < tmaziɣt 'Berber language')
ɛ + ṯ = ḥṯ/ḥt (e.g. tqubeḥt < tqubeɛṯ 'little bird')

There are also other assimilations.

ḏ + ṯ = tt (e.g. tabritt < tabriḏṯ 'path')
d + ṯ = tt (e.g. a t-tawi < a d-ṯawi 'she will bring here')
ḍ + ṯ = ṭṭ (e.g. tyaẓiṭṭ < tyaẓiḍṯ 'hen')
m + ṯ = nt (e.g. taxxant < taxxamṯ 'small room')
ř + ṯ = č (e.g. tameǧač < tameǧařṯ 'egg')

Spirantized consonants become stops after the consonant 'n', this occurs between words as well.

qqimen da < qqimen ḏa 'they sit here'
tilifun tameqqṛant < tilifun ṯameqqṛant 'the big phone'

Sound shifts

Letter ř 
In the history of Western and Central Riffian /l/ has become /r/ in a lot of words, this sound shift has affected other consonants as well.

  in other dialects corresponds to 'ř' (//) in Riffian (e.g. ul > uř 'heart')
 The geminate equivalent, in other dialects corresponds to 'ǧ' (//) in Riffian (e.g. yelli > yeǧi 'my daughter'). It is underlyingly řř.
  in other dialects corresponds to 'č' in Riffian (e.g. weltma > wečma 'my sister'). It is underlyingly řt.

These sound shifts do not occur in the easternmost Riffian dialects of Icebdanen and Iznasen and the westernmost dialects.

Postvocalic r
Postvocalic  preceding a consonantal coda is dropped, as in taddart > taddaat 'house/home'. These sound shifts do not occur in the easternmost Riffian dialects of Icebdanen and Iznasen and the westernmost dialects beyond Ayt Waayaɣeř.

Zenati sound shifts
Additionally, the initial masculine a- prefix is dropped in certain words, e.g., afus 'hand' becomes fus, and afiɣaṛ 'snake' becomes fiɣạạ. This change, characteristic of Zenati Berber varieties, further distances Riffian from neighbouring dialects such as Atlas-Tamazight and Shilha.

Writing system
Like other Berber languages, Riffian has been written with several different systems over the years. Unlike the nearby Tashelhit (Shilha), Riffian Berber has little written literature before the twentieth century. The first written examples of Riffian berber start appearing just before the colonial period. Texts like R. Basset (1897) and S. Biarnay (1917) are transcribed in the Latin alphabet but they are transcribed in a rather deficient way. Most recently (since 2003), Tifinagh has become official throughout Morocco. The Arabic script is not used anymore for writing Riffian Berber. The Berber Latin alphabet continues to be the most used writing system online and in most publications in Morocco and abroad.

Lexicon

Basic vocabulary

Loanwords 
Tarifit has loaned a fair amount of its vocabulary from Arabic, Spanish and French. Around 51.7% of the vocabulary of Tarifit is estimated to have been borrowed (56.1% of nouns and 44.1% of verbs). All loaned verbs follow Riffian conjugations, and some loaned nouns are Berberized as well. A lot of loans are not recognizable because of sound shifts that have undergone, e.g. ǧiřet  'night' (Arabic: al-layla), hřec  'sick' (Arabic: halaka).

Examples of words loaned from Classical/Moroccan Arabic 
 ddenya: 'world' (orig. al-dunyā )
 tayezzaat: 'island' (orig. jazīra )
 řebḥaa: 'ocean' (orig. al-baḥr )
 lwalidin: 'parents' (orig. al-wālidayn )
 ḥseb: 'to count' (orig. ḥasaba )

Examples of words loaned from Spanish 
 familiya: 'family' (orig. familia)
 tpabut: 'duck' (orig. pabo)
 ṣpiṭạạ: 'hospital' (orig. hospital)
 pṛubaa: 'to try' (orig. probar)
 arrimaa: 'to land' (orig. arrimar)

Examples of words loaned from French 
 maamiṭa: 'pot' (orig. marmite)
 furciṭa: 'fork' (orig. fourchette)
 ṣuṣis: 'sausage' (orig. saucisse)
 fumaḍa: 'cream' (orig. pommade)
 jjarḍa: 'garden' (orig. jardin)

Examples of words loaned from Latin
 faacu: 'eagle' (orig. falco)
 aqninni: 'rabbit' (orig. cuniculus)
 fiřu: 'thread' (orig. filum)
 aɣaṛṛabu: 'boat' (orig. carabus)
 asnus: 'donkey foal' (orig. asinus)

Sample Text
From 'An introduction to Tarifiyt Berber (Nador, Morocc)' by Khalid Mourigh and Maarten Kossmann: Sirkuḷasyun (trafic)

AS: annexed state
FS: free state
AD: the particle 'a(d)' "non-realized"

References

Sources
Biarnay, Samuel. 1911. Etude sur le dialecte des Bet't'ioua du Vieil-Arzeu. Alger: Carbonel.
Biarnay, Samuel. 1917. Etude sur les dialectes berbères du Rif. Paris: Leroux.
Cadi, Kaddour. 1987. Système verbal rifain. Forme et sens. Paris: Peeters.
Colin, Georges Séraphin. 1929. "Le parler berbère des Gmara." Hespéris 9: 43–58.
Kossmann, Maarten. 2000. Esquisse grammaticale du rifain oriental. Paris: Peeters.
Lafkioui, Mena. 2007. Atlas linguistique des variétés berbères du Rif. Köln: Rüdiger Köppe.
McClelland, Clive. 1996. Interrelations of prosody, clause structure and discourse pragmatics in Tarifit Berber. University of Texas at Arlington.
McClelland, Clive. The Interrelations of Syntax, Narrative Structure, and Prosody in a Berber Language (Studies in Linguistics and Semiotics, V. 8). Lewiston, NY: Edwin Mellen Press, 2000.
Mourigh, K., & Kossmann, M. 2020. An introduction to Tarifiyt Berber (Nador, Morocco) (Lehrbücher orientalischer Sprachen ; volume IV/1).
Renisio, A. 1932. Etude sur les dialectes berbères des Beni Iznassen, du Rif et des Senhaja de Sraïr. Paris: Leroux.

External links

 Tarifiyt Berber Vocabulary List (from the World Loanword Database)
 INALCO report on Tarifit (fr)

Berber languages
Languages of Morocco
Riff languages